The 2014 Summit League women's soccer tournament was the postseason women's soccer tournament for the Summit League held on November 6 and 8, 2014. The three-match tournament took place at CIBER Field at the University of Denver Soccer Stadium in Denver, Colorado. The four-team single-elimination tournament consisted of two rounds based on seeding from regular season conference play. The Denver Pioneers were the defending champions, but were unable to defend their title after they lost the final match to the champion: South Dakota State. The tournament win was South Dakota State's second as a member of the conference, and second for coach Lang Wedemeyer. As tournament champions, South Dakota State earned the Summit League's automatic berth into the 2014 NCAA Division I Women's Soccer Tournament.

Seeding
The top four of the ten teams competing during the regular season qualified for the 2014 tournament. Seeding was based on regular season conference records. IUPUI earned the second seed over Denver, based on IUPUI having the head-to-head tiebreaker over the Pioneers.

Bracket

Schedule

Semifinals

Final

All-Tournament Team
Source:

MVP in bold

References

Summit League Women's Soccer Tournament